Isares is a single EP by Manual. It was released in July 2003 by Static Caravan.

Track listing
"A Familiar Place" – 7:27
"Stealing Through" – 2:38
"Wake" – 5:22
"Horizon" – 8:36

References

External links
Almost Cool's review of Isares
Angry Ape's review of Isares
Static Caravan information page for Isares
Stylus Magazine's review of Isares

2003 EPs